Ebba Wieder (born 13 July 1998) is a Swedish footballer who plays as a midfielder.

Vittsjö GIK announced on 14 April 2021 that she is taking an indefinite break from football to focus on her mental health.

Honours 
Rosengård
Winner
 Damallsvenskan (3): 2013, 2014, 2015
 Svenska Supercupen: 2015/2016, 2016/2017, 2017/2018

References

External links 
 
 
 
  (archive)
 

1998 births
Living people
Swedish women's footballers
FC Rosengård players
Damallsvenskan players
Women's association football midfielders